Uday K Mehta is an Indian Film producer and writer predominantly works in South Indian cinema. He has worked in popular movies like Brahmachari, Sinnga and others.

Career 
Uday K Mehta started his career as a film producer in 2009 with his film 'Ravana'. After this Mehta produced a Kannada film Krishnan Love Story in 2010. The film was hit at box office.

In 2013 Mehta produced Bachchan, starring Sudeep, Jagapathi Babu and Bhavana. It is the biggest big budget movie of Mehta's career.

In 2016, Mehta produced another Kannada romantic film Krishna-Rukku.

In the year 2019 Uday Mehta produced Brahmachari, a Comedy-drama film starring Sathish Ninasam and Aditi Prabhudeva. He also wrote script for this film. Brahmachari is the sequel to Mehta's 2014 Kannada film Love in Mandya. In the same year Mehta produced Sinnga starring Chiranjeevi Sarja, Aditi Prabhudeva.

Filmography

References

External links 
 

Living people
Kannada film producers
Film producers from Karnataka
Year of birth missing (living people)